The 1987 Edgecumbe earthquake measured 6.5 on the moment magnitude scale and struck the Bay of Plenty region of New Zealand at 1:42 pm on 2 March. The hypocentre was at a shallow depth of 8 km. It was the most damaging earthquake New Zealand had experienced since the 1968 Inangahua earthquake.

Main event
The main shock was preceded for two weeks by earthquake swarms in two areas of the Bay of Plenty. A swarm started on 21 February off-shore from Maketu, near Te Puke, 40 kilometres from the main shock's epicentre, and another swarm started on 26 February between Matata and Thornton, very close to the epicentre. Then there was a 5.2  earthquake at 1:35 pm on 2 March, followed by the main shock seven minutes later. The main shock appears to have actually consisted of two ruptures, and possibly a third. There were indications that the first rupture propagated towards the south-west, triggering a second rupture 9 kilometres to the south-west and three seconds after the first. There is also the possibility of a third, significantly smaller, rupture another ten seconds later. The largest aftershock measured 5.6 and struck nine minutes later at 1.51 pm.

Eleven ground-surface ruptures occurred in the Rangitaiki Plains, though no active faults had previously been recognised on the Plains. The old scarp had previously been unrecognised, but was later seen in aerial photographs taken before the earthquake. The northern end of the scarp is one kilometre east of Edgecumbe, and the scarp runs southwest to a point three kilometres north of Te Teko. The most spectacular feature of the scarp was a deep prominent fissure up to 3 metres wide and 3–4 metres deep, mostly with near-vertical walls, that opened up along the fault. It appears that the fault has ruptured at least once previously in the past 1800 years. The intense ground shaking led to a large number of ground surface failures, including sand boils, ridge-top shatters and debris avalanches on steeper slopes.

The Rangitaiki Plains lie within the Taupo Volcanic Zone, which is widening. During the Edgecumbe earthquake, the area widened by 1.2 metres.

The most damage was in the towns of Edgecumbe, Te Teko, Kawerau, Matata and Thornton, where chimneys toppled and poorly constructed houses were seriously damaged. The hardest hit was Edgecumbe, with damage to approximately 50% of its houses. There was extensive damage to its milk factory, with large storage tanks toppled. Railway tracks in the town were bent and buckled, and an 80-tonne New Zealand Railways DC class locomotive toppled over.

Twenty-five people suffered injuries that needed medical attention, but no-one was killed. The foreshock seven minutes before the main shock had cut the power supply, and many people had moved away from heavy machinery and out of buildings that then collapsed in the main earthquake.

Gallery

See also

 List of earthquakes in New Zealand

References

External links

History of the Bay of Plenty Region
1987 Edgecumbe
Edgecumbe Earthquake, 1987
Edgecumbe
March 1987 events in New Zealand
1987 disasters in New Zealand